was a Japanese social worker popularly known as the mother of 2,000 American Japanese mixed orphans.

Early life 
She was born in Tokyo, Japan on September 19, 1901. She was the oldest daughter of Baron Hisaya Iwasaki, who was known as the richest man in Japan. She was thus the granddaughter of Iwasaki Yataro, the founder of the Mitsubishi Zaibatsu conglomerate. As a child, she attended private girls' schools in Ochanomizu until she was 15. After that she was taught by Umeko Tsuda, her private tutor.

In 1922, she married Japanese diplomat Renzo Sawada, who represented Japan as a diplomat and United Nations ambassador. He was a Christian and so she converted to Christianity when they got married. They had four children.

Elizabeth Saunders Home 
Renzo's diplomatic work took them to Buenos Aires, Beijing, London, Paris, and New York City. During her life outside Japan as the wife of a diplomat, she met and befriended many people who would later help her found the Elizabeth Saunders Home, like Josephine Baker. While living in London, she had the opportunity to visit an orphanage operated by Thomas J. Barnardo called Dr. Barnardo's home, which would later inspire her to start her own.

After World War II, Sawada took in many mixed-race children who were abandoned and discriminated against because their mothers were Japanese and their fathers were American soldiers. Eventually, there were more children than she could house in her home with her, so in 1948 she sold all of her possessions and used the money to found the Elizabeth Saunders Home in Oiso, Kanagawa, Japan. It was named for Elizabeth Saunders, who was the first donor to the orphanage. The Japanese government would not support the orphanage, and also would not allow it to be registered as a non-profit, and so Sawada constantly had trouble finding funding. Sawada visited America in 1949 and 1950 to give lectures and gather donations for the orphanage. Almost 2,000 children stayed there, and Sawada became known as the "Mother of 2,000 children".

Many of those she met during her travels adopted children from the orphanage, including Josephine Baker, who also put on concerts to benefit the orphanage.

Sawada was awarded the Order of the Sacred Treasure, second class on April 29, 1972.

She died of a heart attack in Mallorca on May 12, 1980.

Further reading
Elizabeth Anne Hemphill, The Least of These: Miki Sawada and Her Children (1981), Weatherhill,

See also
Mabel Grammer, who did similar work with mixed race orphans in Germany

References

Japanese social workers
1901 births
1980 deaths